Emin Gök (born 15 February 1988 in Mersin) is a Turkish volleyball player. He is currently a player of the Fenerbahçe Grundig. He also played for Arkas Spor between 2007–2013.

References

External links
 

1988 births
Living people
Turkish men's volleyball players
Arkas Spor volleyball players
Fenerbahçe volleyballers
Galatasaray S.K. (men's volleyball) players
21st-century Turkish people